Kerlson Agathe (born 8 March 1991) is a Mauritian international footballer who plays for Pamplemousses as a midfielder.

Career
Born in Pamplemousses, he has played club football for Pamplemousses.

He made his international debut for Mauritius in 2017.

References

1991 births
Living people
Mauritian footballers
Mauritius international footballers
Pamplemousses SC players
Association football midfielders